The Kerala Film Critics Association Award for Second Best Film is an award presented annually at the Kerala Film Critics Association Awards of India to the second best film in Malayalam cinema.

Winners

See also
 Kerala Film Critics Association Award for Best Film

References

Film
Awards for best film